The Joint Institute for Nuclear Research (JINR), in Dubna, Moscow Oblast (110 km north of Moscow), Russia, is an international research center for nuclear sciences, with 5500 staff members including 1200 researchers holding over 1000 Ph.Ds from eighteen countries. Most scientists, however, are eminent Russian scientists.

The institute has seven laboratories, each with its own specialisation: theoretical physics, high energy physics (particle physics), heavy ion physics, condensed matter physics, nuclear reactions, neutron physics, and information technology. The institute has a division to study radiation and radiobiological research and other ad hoc experimental physics experiments.

Principal research instruments include a nuclotron superconductive particle accelerator (particle energy: 7 GeV), three isochronous cyclotrons (120, 145, 650 MeV), a phasitron (680 MeV) and a synchrophasotron (4 GeV). The site has a neutron fast-pulse reactor (1500MW pulse) with nineteen associated instruments receiving neutron beams.

Founding
The Joint Institute for Nuclear Research was established on the basis of an agreement signed on March 26, 1956, in Moscow by representatives of the governments of the eleven founding countries, with a view to combining their scientific and material potential. The USSR contributed 50 percent, the People's Republic of China 20 percent. On February 1, 1957, JINR was registered by the United Nations. The institute is located in Dubna, 120 km north of Moscow.

At the time of the creation of JINR, the Institute of Nuclear Problems (INP) of the Academy of Sciences of the USSR already existed at the site of the future Dubna since the late 1940s, and it launched a program of fundamental and applied research at the synchrocyclotron. The Electrophysics Laboratory of the Academy of Sciences of the USSR (EFLAN) was established, and under the guidance of Academician Vladimir Veksler, work began to create a new accelerator – a proton synchrophasotron – with a record energy of 10 GeV at that time.

By the mid-1950s, there was a worldwide consensus that nuclear science should be accessible and that only broad cooperation could ensure the progressive development of this research, as well as the peaceful use of atomic energy. Thus, in 1954, near Geneva, CERN (European Organization for Nuclear Research) was established. At about the same time, the countries that belonged to the socialist community decided to establish a Joint Institute for Nuclear Research on the basis of the INP and EFLAN.

The first director of the United Institute was Professor D. I. Blokhintsev, who just completed the creation of Obninsk Nuclear Power Plant the world's first nuclear power plant in Obninsk. The first vice-directors of JINR were professors Marian Danysz (Poland) and V. Votruba (Czechoslovakia).

The history of the formation of the JINR is associated with the names of prominent scientists and Professors. The following list provides some of the names of prominent Scientists.

Nikolay Bogolyubov
 Lajos Jánossy
 Leopold Infeld
 Igor Kurchatov
 Heinz Pose
 G. Nevodnichansky
 AM Petrosyants
 E. Slavsky 
 Heinz Barwich
 
 Igor Tamm
 
H. Hulubey
L. Janos 
 Alexander Baldin
 Wang Ganchang
 Vladimir Veksler
 Nikolay Govorun
 M. Gmitro
 E. Tsyganov
 Venedikt Dzhelepov
 I. Zvara
 Jaroslav Kožešník
 D. Kish
 
 Jaroslav Kožešník
 Moisey Markov
 Șerban Țițeica
 VA Matveev
 MG Meshcheryakov
 Georgi Nadjakov
 
 Le Van Thiem
 Yuri Oganessian
 
 Heinz Pose
 Bruno Pontecorvo
 VP Sarantsev
 N. Sodnoy
 Boris Arbuzov
 R. Sosnovski
 
 Albert Tavkhelidze
 I. Todorov
 I. Ulegla
 I. Ursu
 Georgy Flyorov
 Ilya Frank
 H. Hristov
 
 Șerban Țițeica
 F. Shapiro
 Dmitry Shirkov
 D. Ebert
 Heinz Barwich
 E. Yanik (Polish: Jerzy Janik)

Cooperation
The JINR cooperates with many organizations. One of the main organizations with which JINR cooperates is UNESCO; its collaboration with JINR started in 1997 in order to develop basic sciences and try to achieve sustainable development. Joint activities include training programmes and grant mechanisms for researchers in the basic science. This international scientific cooperation and knowledge sharing in key scientific fields is one of the main 2030 UNESCO goals, the achievement of Sustainable Development. The United Nations General Assembly and UNESCO General Conference named 2019 as The International Year of the Periodic Table of Chemical Elements (IYPTE 2019); this reinforced the cooperation between these two organizations. In addition, JINR was one of the observers of European Organization for Nuclear Research (CERN) from 2014 till 25 March 2022.

As of 1st of January 2023, JINR members are 13 states:

 
 
  
 
 
 
 
 
 
 
 
 
 

Associate members are:

 
 
 
 
 

Scientific collaboration with organizations including:
 CERN – since 2014, subject to restrictions detailed in the CERN Council resolutions 3671 and 3638  following the invasion of Ukraine by the Russian Federation. Collaboration to be reviewed well in advance of January 2025 (expiration date of the International Cooperation Agreement).
 UNESCO – since 1997
 BMBF (since 1991)
 INFN (1996)
 University of Turin (since 1999)
 EPS since 1990

Former members: In December 2022 the Czech Republic, Poland and Ukraine terminated their membership and Bulgaria and Romania suspended their participation in JINR. Democratic People's Republic of Korea was one of the founding states in 1956, however has been suspended from participating in JINR since 2015.

Structure of research
The main fields of the institute's research are:
 Theoretical physics
 Elementary particle physics
 Relativistic nuclear physics
 Heavy ion physics
 Low and intermediate energy physics
 Nuclear physics with neutrons
 Condensed matter physics
 Radiobiology
 Computer networking, computing and computational physics
 Educational programme

The JINR possess eight laboratories and University Centre.

Superheavy Element Factory
The Superheavy Element Factory (SHE factory) at the JINR, opened in 2019, is a new experimental complex dedicated to superheavy element research. Its facilities enable a tenfold increase in beam intensity; such an increase in sensitivity enables the study of reactions with lower cross sections that would otherwise be inaccessible. Sergey Dmitriev, director of the Flerov Laboratory of Nuclear Reactions, believes that the SHE factory will enable closer examination of nuclei near the limits of stability, as well as experiments aimed at the synthesis of elements 119 and 120.

Scientific achievements
More than 40 major achievements in particle physics have been made through experiments at JINR. Including
 1957 - prediction of Neutrino oscillation in published on JETP by Bruno Pontecorvo
 1959 – nonradiative transitions in mesoatoms
 1960 – antisigma-minus hyperon
 1966 – element 102 (nobelium)
 1972 – postradiative regeneration of cells
 1973 – quark counting rule
 1975 – phenomenon of slow neutron confinement
 1976 - element 107 (bohrium)
 1988 – regularity of resonant formation of muonic molecules in deuterium
 1999 - element 114 (flerovium)
 2000 - element 116 (livermorium)
 2002 - element 118 (oganesson)
 2003 - element 115 (moscovium) and element 113 (nihonium)
 2006 – chemical identification of element 112 (copernicium)
 2010 – successful synthesis of element 117 (tennessine)

Prizes and awards
JINR has instituted awards to honour and encourage high-level research in the fields of physics and mathematics since 1961.
 The Bogolyubov Prize – The Bogoliubov Prize is an award offered to young researchers in theoretical physics.
 The Bogolyubov Prize – an international award to scientists with outstanding contribution to theoretical physics and applied mathematics.
 The Bruno Pontecorvo Prize – is an award to scientists with contribution to elementary particle physics.
The first award was dedicated to Wang Ganchang, deputy director from 1958 to 1960 and the Soviet Professor Vladimir Veksler for the discovery of antisigma-minus hyperon. The experimental group led by Professor Wang Ganchang, analysed more than 40,000 photographs which recorded tens of thousands of nuclear interactions taken in the propane bubble chamber, produced by the 10 GeV synchrophasotron used to bombard a target forming high energy mesons, was the first to discover the anti-sigma minus hyperon particles on March 9, 1959:

The discovery of this new unstable antiparticle which decays in (1.18±0.07)·10−10 s into an antineutron and a negative pion was announced in September of that year:

No-one doubted at the time that this particle was elementary, but a few years later, this hyperon, the proton, the neutron, the pion and other hadrons had lost their status of elementary particles as they turned out to be complex particles too consisting of quarks and antiquarks.

Directors
 (1956–1965)
Nikolay Bogolyubov (1966–1988)
 (1989–1991)
Vladimir Kadyshevsky (1992–2005)
 (2005–2010)
 (May 2010–September 2011) ad interim
Victor A. Matveev (2012–2020)
Grigory V. Trubnikov (2021 - )

Gallery

See also 
 Nuclotron
 Institute for Nuclear Research
 Budker Institute of Nuclear Physics, Russian particle physics laboratory in Novosibirsk
 Institute for High Energy Physics, Russian particle physics laboratory in the vicinity of Moscow; located south of Moscow
 Institute for Theoretical and Experimental Physics, Russian particle physics laboratory in the vicinity of Moscow; located in Moscow proper
 Bogolyubov Prize for young scientists, an award for young scientists provided by JINR

Notes

References

External links
 JINR Website
 Frank Laboratory of Neutron Physics Website

Research institutes established in 1956
Research institutes in Russia
Nuclear research institutes
Research institutes in the Soviet Union
International research institutes
Particle physics facilities
Nuclear research institutes in Russia
Nuclear technology in the Soviet Union
Institutes associated with CERN

Ivan Zlatev